Függetlenség (lit. Independence) was a Hungarian language daily newspaper. It was founded in 1906, with the purpose of serving as the information source for the Magyars and Hungarian language-speaking population in Bács-Bodrog County within the Kingdom of Hungary in Austria-Hungary. It was published in Subotica (Today in Serbia) as the organ of Independence Party. It was the journal of Simon Mukits and Jákó Fischer. Függetlenség was published until 1908. Függetlenség reappeared in 1910 and finally was disestablished in 1913.

See also
 Hungarians in Vojvodina

External links
 (Hungarian) Születésnapi Újság, születésnapi újságok, régi újság minta ajándék ...
 (Hungarian) Szabadka városfejlődése 1700 és 1910 között
 (Hungarian) LÉTÜNK - TÁRSADALOM, TUDOMÁNY, KULTÚRA, 2002.1-2,p.16

References

History of Subotica
Hungarian-language newspapers
Publications established in 1906
Publications disestablished in 1913
Defunct newspapers published in Serbia
1906 establishments in Austria-Hungary